The Bob Cummings Lincoln Trail Bridge crosses the Ohio River and connects the towns of Cannelton, Indiana and Hawesville, Kentucky. Indiana State Road 237 becomes Kentucky Route 69 upon entering Hawesville.

Construction began in June 1964 and the bridge opened on December 21, 1966.  The steel arch bridge with its suspended deck was a toll facility until the state of Indiana lifted the tolls in the 1990s.

Bob Cummings, for whom the bridge was named on November 17, 1974, was the editor of the Cannelton News and a booster of Cannelton in general until his death on July 25, 1971.

New connections
To the north, the bridge connects to a rerouted five-mile stretch of Indiana 237, which now by-passes Cannelton and dramatically cuts the time of travel to Indiana 37, which is the primary link to Interstate 64 for both Perry County as well as Hancock County, Kentucky.

In Hawesville, Kentucky 69 takes a sharp westward turn into the downtown area before reaching a traffic signal at the junction of Kentucky 3101.  The Kentucky Transportation Cabinet is studying a direct route for Kentucky 69 that would eliminate the sharp turns and steep hill just outside the downtown area.

Further reading
Lincoln Trail Bridge at Bridges & Tunnels

Bridges completed in 1966
Through arch bridges in the United States
Road bridges in Kentucky
Buildings and structures in Hancock County, Kentucky
Bridges over the Ohio River
Transportation buildings and structures in Perry County, Indiana
Road bridges in Indiana
Former toll bridges in Indiana
Former toll bridges in Kentucky
Steel bridges in the United States
Transportation in Hancock County, Kentucky
1966 establishments in Indiana
1966 establishments in Kentucky